Tobias Oriwol (born May 13, 1985) is a Canadian backstroke swimmer who competed in two consecutive Summer Olympics in 2008 and 2012.

Tobias swam in the semifinals of the men's 200-metre backstroke at the 2008 Summer Olympics in Beijing, and afterward retired to focus on his urban planning degree from Harvard University.  He returned to competition in 2010 and qualified to compete at the 2012 Summer Olympics in London, and again advanced to the semifinals of his signature 200-metre event.  He also swam in the preliminary heats of the 4x200-metre freestyle relay as a member of the Canadian team in that event.

References

1985 births
Living people
Canadian male backstroke swimmers
Olympic swimmers of Canada
People from Westmount, Quebec
Sportspeople from Quebec
Swimmers at the 2007 Pan American Games
Swimmers at the 2008 Summer Olympics
Swimmers at the 2012 Summer Olympics
Pan American Games medalists in swimming
Pan American Games bronze medalists for Canada
Medalists at the 2003 Pan American Games
Harvard Graduate School of Design alumni